Derek Roddy (born August 28, 1972) is an American drummer and snake breeder, originally from Myrtle Beach, South Carolina. His ability to record entire drum tracks in one or two takes earned him the nickname "One Take".

Derek has gained a reputation worldwide as an extreme metal drummer. Though he may be known as the second drummer of Hate Eternal, he has also played and recorded with Nile, Malevolent Creation, Divine Empire, Council of the Fallen (where he also played guitar), Today Is the Day, Traumedy and Aurora Borealis. 

On March 28, 2006, Roddy announced his departure from Hate Eternal. In February 2006, Roddy was briefly named as the drummer for Blotted Science, but was unable to record due to conflicting schedules. Lamb of God drummer Chris Adler had also been considered for the project. 

Around 2007, Roddy started an instrumental band called Serpents Rise, which almost immediately grabbed the attention of drummers around the world. Serpents Rise is often referred to by fans as having an obscure sound for their bizarre guitar parts and incorporation of various percussion instruments. In 2010 Roddy was one out of seven drummers who auditioned to replace Mike Portnoy as the drummer for Dream Theater.

Discography

With Aurora Borealis
 Praise the Archaic Light's Embrace (1998)
 Northern Lights (2000)
 Northern Lights: DieHard Release (2001)

With Council of the Fallen
 Demo (1999)
 Revealing Damnation (2002)

With Creature
 Demo (1997)

With Deboning Method
 Demo (1992)
 Cold Demo (1993)

With Divine Empire
 Redemption (1998)

With Gothic Outcasts
 Sights Unseen (1997)

With Hate Eternal
 King of All Kings (September 16, 2002)
 I, Monarch (June 27, 2005)

With Malevolent Creation
 In Cold Blood (1997)

With Nile
 Black Seeds of Vengeance (September 5, 2000)

With Today Is the Day
 Axis of Eden (2007)

Various artists
 Drum Nation Vol. 3 (2006)
 Visionaries of the Macabre: Vol.1 (1998)
 Worldwide Metal Inquisition (1998)

With Serpents Rise
 Serpents Rise (2010)
 Serpents Rise 2 (2012)
 Serpents Rise III (2014)

Gear

Derek is a full endorser of DW drums and hardware, Paiste cymbals, Remo drumheads, Vater drumsticks, and Axis pedals. Derek was a former endorser of Sonor drums prior to his switch to DW.  Before signing on with Meinl, Derek also used Paiste and then Sabian cymbals. He also used Aquarian drumheads in the past.

Drums: DW Collector's Series Maple: Natural to Regal Burst over Ivory Ebony Exotic
20" x 15" Kick Drum (x2)
10" x 8" Tom
12" x 8" Tom
8" x 8" Tom
14" x 14" Floor Tom
16" x 16" Floor Tom
10" x 5" Snare
13" x 5" Snare
14" x 6.5" Collector's Bronze Snare (knurled finish)
Cymbals: Meinl
8" Soundcaster Custom Splash
10" Soundcaster Custom Splash
20" Mb20 Rock China
13" Byzance Brilliant Serpents Hi-hats
16" Soundcaster Custom Medium Crash
17" Soundcaster Custom Medium Crash
12" Generation X Filter China
10" Generation X Filter China
18" Mb20 Rock China
21" Byzance Brilliant Serpents Ride
18" Soundcaster Custom Medium Crash
8" Generation X FX Hi-hats
Drumheads: Remo
Drumsticks: Vater		
Derek Roddy Signature: Derek's model is in between a 5A and 5B in the grip. The stick features a really quick taper to a small acorn tip for warm, but defined cymbal tones. A great stick for a variety of musical applications.
Pedals: Axis
A21 Derek Roddy Signature pedals
E-kit Triggers
Axis Wrecking Ball Beaters

External links
Derek Roddy at drummerworld.com
Derek Roddy at moderndrummer.com
Interview from August 2006
The Truth About Developing Speed
Derek Roddy's Black Headed Pythons

References

1972 births
Living people
American heavy metal drummers
American heavy metal musicians
American multi-instrumentalists
Death metal musicians
People from Deerfield Beach, Florida
Today Is the Day members
20th-century American drummers
American male drummers
Malevolent Creation members
Hate Eternal members
Blotted Science members
21st-century American drummers
20th-century American male musicians
21st-century American male musicians